Coed y Ciliau is a Site of Special Scientific Interest in Brecknock, Powys, Wales. The site is near the Dulais valley and is best known for multiple species of Lichen.

References

See also
List of Sites of Special Scientific Interest in Brecknock

Sites of Special Scientific Interest in Brecknock